Alexei Kogalev (born 16 April 1966) is a Belgian diver. He competed in the men's 3 metre springboard event at the 1992 Summer Olympics.

References

1966 births
Living people
Belgian male divers
Olympic divers of Belgium
Divers at the 1992 Summer Olympics
People from Pyriatyn